Sheikh Mansur Chechen Peacekeeping Battalion or simply the Sheikh Mansur Battalion is one of several Chechen volunteer Armed Formations participating in the Russian-Ukrainian war on the side of the Armed Forces of Ukraine. The battalion is named in honour of Sheikh Mansur, a Chechen military commander and an Islamic leader who fought against the expansion of the Russian Empire into the Caucasus during the late 18th century. The battalion has been active since 2014 and is made up of mostly Chechen volunteers, many of whom are veterans of the First Chechen War and Second Chechen War.

Creation 
The battalion was founded in 2014, in Denmark. It was created by the Free Caucasus Organization, which was created in 2006 in Denmark by political emigrants from countries/regions in the Caucasus and in Europe. In October 2014, the Free Caucasus GPA Presidium announced the creation of a battalion named after Sheikh Mansur in order to participate in the war in eastern Ukraine commanded by Muslim Cheberloyevsky (a veteran of the two Chechen-Russian wars). The battalion was formed upon the splitting off of a faction from the Dudayev battalion, due to leaders deciding the need to act at two important fronts which at the time were Kramatorsk and Mariupol. It was the second Chechen battalion, after the previously formed Dzhokhar Dudayev battalion, which was proven itself well and received approval and support from the Ukrainian authorities.

For a time, the Battalion operated under the command of the Ukrainian Volunteer Corps, an independent volunteer battalion of the far-right party Right Sector.

Participation in the Russo-Ukrainian war 
The battalion has since 2014 participated in the war in Donbas. During the Shyrokyne standoff, the Sheikh Mansur battalion together with other Ukrainian forces fought against Russian-backed separatists in the village of Shyrokyne, east of Mariupol in 2015. The battalion handed in its weapons in September 2019; as one of the last units composed purely of volunteer soldiers. 

The battalion was reported to be active again during the 2022 Russian invasion of Ukraine. A video released by the battalion in March 2022 showing intense fighting against Russian forces outside of Kyiv confirmed the presence of the Sheikh Mansur battalion in Ukraine. The Sheikh Mansur Battalion as well as the Dzhokhar Dudayev Battalion held the defense near Kyiv and participated in partisan operations, ambushes, sabotage work and mining during the Battle of Kyiv. They had previously fought in the Battle of Mariupol, but they left for Kyiv as they deemed it was more important to defend the capital city.

After pushing Russian forces out of Kyiv during the Kyiv offensive, fighters of the battalion followed the Russian troops and fought in the Sumy region as part of the Northeastern Ukraine campaign. Since then, the battalion has fought in the Donetsk and Lugansk regions, most notably taking part during the Battle of Sievierodonetsk since at least June 2022. In July 2022, they declared an insurgency in Chechnya.

From September to November of 2022, the battalion has been in battles with Russian forces on the Zaporizhzhian front.

The battalion has been fighting in the Battle of Bakhmut and Battle of Soledar since at least November 2022, which as of December 2022 is experiencing the scenes of intense fighting.

Sanctions 
The Ukrainian Government imposed sanctions against fighters from the battalion in 2021. 

In 2018 Timur Tumgoev, a veteran of the Donbas war and member of the battalion was extradited to Russia. According to several reports he was tortured and sentenced to 16 years in prison. Several fighters are still threatened with extradition, such as Akhmed Ilaev and Ali Bakaev. These extraditions and sanctions have been criticized by several Ukrainian commanders such as Dmytro Yarosh, who blamed the Russian FSB and elements within the Ukrainian government.

Commanders 

 Battalion Commander - Muslim Cheberloyevsky 
 Chief of Staff of the battalion - Muslim Idrisov

See also 
 Dzhokhar Dudayev Battalion
 Separate Special Purpose Battalion
 2022 Russian invasion of Ukraine 
 Ukrainian volunteer battalions
 Russo-Ukrainian War

References

2014 establishments in Ukraine
Battalions of Ukraine
Chechen armies in exile
Military units and formations established in 2014
Military units and formations of Ukraine in the war in Donbas